Evgeniya Rodina and Arina Rodionova won the title by defeating Julia Cohen and Urszula Radwańska 2-6, 6-3, 6-1 in the final.

Seeds

Draw

Finals

Top half

Bottom half

Sources
Main Draw 

Girls' Doubles
Australian Open, 2007 Girls' Doubles